M.K. Gopinathan Nair, popularly known as Vaisakhan, is an Indian short story writer, playwright, and screenwriter. , he is the President of Kerala Sahitya Akademi. His stories are known for their simplicity in style and freshness in theme. Many of his stories feature the Indian Railways as the backdrop.

Early life, education and career 
Vaisakhan was born in 1940 as Gopinathan to A.V. Krishna Kurup and Narayani Amma in Muvattupuzha. He did his education from Maharaja's College, Ernakulam, Nirmala College, and St. Albert's College.

In 1964, he was appointed in the Southern Railway (India) as the station master. After 20 years of service, Vaisakhan took a voluntary retirement to pursue a full-time career in writing.

Vaisakhan was married to Padma, who died in 1998. They have three children - Praveen, Pradeep, and Poornima. He currently lives in Paravattani, in Thrissur district.

Literary career 
Vaisakhan's most notable work is Noolpalam Kadakkunnavar, a story that has won multiple awards and critical acclaim. His other published books include:

Short story collection 
 Appeal Anyayabhagam (അപ്പീൽ അന്യായഭാഗം)
 Athirukalillathe (അതിരുകളില്ലാതെ)
 Akalathil Vasantham (അകാലത്തിൽ വസന്തം )
 Bommidippoondiyile Palam (ബൊമ്മിഡിപുണ്ടിയിലെ പാലം)
 Yamakam (യമകം)
 Kathakal (കഥകൾ)
 Priyappetta Kathakal (പ്രിയപ്പെട്ട കഥകൾ)
 Silencer (സൈലൻസർ)

Children's literature 
 Meen Kaykkunna Maram (മീന്‍ കായ്ക്കുന്ന മരം)
 Kathakalude Albhuthalokam (കഥകളുടെ അത്ഭുതലോകം)

Memoirs 
 Vaisakhante Jeevithachinthakal (വൈശാഖന്റെ ജീവിതചിന്തകൾ)
 Oru Manassinte Rasathanthram (ഒരു മനസ്സിന്റെ രസതന്ത്രം)
 Ormayude Choottuvettam (ഒര്‍മ്മയുടെ ചൂട്ടുവെട്ടം)
 Ormayude Palangalil Pathinanju Sthreekal (ഒര്‍മ്മയുടെ പാളങ്ങളിൽ പതിനഞ്ചു സ്ത്രീകൾ)

Major awards 
 1989: Kerala Sahitya Akademi Award for Story – Noolpalam Kadakkunnavar
 1992: Cherukad Award – Noolpalam Kadakkunnavar
 1993: Abu Dhabi Shakthi Award
 2010: M.C. Joseph Award
 2010: Kamala Surayya Award – Silencer (Short story collection)
 2013: Ayanam - C.V. Sreeraman Katha Puraskaram
 2017: Prof. Joseph Mundasserry Award
 2021: Kerala Sahitya Akademi Fellowship

Positions held 
 President, Kerala Sahitya Akademi (August 2016 – present)
 President, Purogamana Kala Sahitya Sangham (2013–2018)
 Member, Thunchan Smaraka Samithi ( - present)
 Former Chairman, Kunchan Nambiar Smarakam - Killikurissimangalam
 Former Advisor, Sahitya Akademi
 Former Administration team member, Kerala Sahitya Akademi

See also
 List of Indian writers

References 

Living people
1940 births
20th-century Indian short story writers
Indian memoirists
Malayalam-language writers
Indian children's writers
Dramatists and playwrights from Kerala
People from Muvattupuzha
Maharaja's College, Ernakulam alumni
20th-century Indian dramatists and playwrights